Epoetin alfa is a human erythropoietin produced in cell culture using recombinant DNA technology. Authorised by the European Medicines Agency on 28 August 2007, it stimulates erythropoiesis (increasing red blood cell levels) and is used to treat anemia, commonly associated with chronic kidney failure and cancer chemotherapy.

Epoetin is manufactured and marketed by Amgen under the brand name Epogen. Johnson & Johnson subsidiary Janssen Biotech (formerly Ortho Biotech Products, LP), sells the same drug under the name Procrit, pursuant to a product license agreement. The average cost per  patient in the U.S. was $8,447 in 2009.  Darbepoetin alfa (rINN)  is a glycosylation analog of erythropoietin containing two additional N-linked carbohydrate chains, also manufactured and marketed by Amgen, with a brand name of Aranesp. The Food and Drug Administration (FDA) warnings and safety precautions for Procrit, Epogen and Aranesp are identical.

For several years, epoetin alfa has accounted for the single greatest drug expenditure paid by the U.S. Medicare system; in 2010, the program paid $2 billion for the drug. Raising hemoglobin levels has been found in some studies to be associated with higher risks of thrombotic events, strokes and death.

It is on the World Health Organization's List of Essential Medicines.

Medical uses 

Erythropoietin is available as a therapeutic agent produced by recombinant DNA technology in mammalian cell culture. It is used in treating anemia resulting from chronic kidney disease and myelodysplasia, from the treatment of cancer (chemotherapy and radiation).

Anemia caused by kidney disease 

For people who require dialysis or have chronic kidney disease, iron should be given with erythropoietin, depending on some laboratory parameters such as ferritin and transferrin saturation. Dialysis patients in the U.S. are most often given Epogen; other brands of epoetin may be used in other countries.

Erythropoietin is also used to treat anemia in people with chronic kidney disease who are not on dialysis (those in Stage 3 or 4 disease and those living with a kidney transplant). There are two types of erythropoietin for people with anemia due to chronic kidney disease (not on dialysis).

Anemia caused by cancer 
In March 2008, a panel of advisers for the U.S. Food and Drug Administration (FDA) supported keeping erythropoiesis-stimulating agents (ESAs) produced by Amgen and Johnson & Johnson on the market for use in cancer patients. The FDA has focused its concern on study results from some clinical trials showing an increased risk of death and tumor growth in chemotherapy patients taking the anti-anemia drugs.

Anemia in critically ill people 

Erythropoietin is used to treat people with anemia resulting from critical illness.

In a randomized controlled trial, erythropoietin was shown to not change the number of blood transfusions required by critically ill patients. A surprising finding in this study was a small mortality reduction in patients receiving erythropoietin. This result was statistically significant after 29 days but not at 140 days. The mortality difference was most marked in patients admitted to the ICU for trauma. The authors provide several hypotheses for potential etiologies of this reduced mortality, but, given the known increase in thrombosis and increased benefit in trauma patients as well as marginal nonsignificant benefit (adjusted hazard ratio of 0.9) in surgery patients, it could be speculated that some of the benefit might be secondary to the procoagulant effect of erythropoietin.  Regardless, this study suggests further research may be necessary to see which critical care patients, if any, might benefit from administration of erythropoietin. Any benefit of erythropoietin use must be weighed against the increased likelihood of thrombosis, which has been demonstrated in numerous trials.

Neurological diseases 

Erythropoietin has been hypothesized to be beneficial in treating certain neurological diseases such as schizophrenia and stroke. Some research has suggested that erythropoietin improves the survival rate in children with cerebral malaria, which is caused by the malaria parasite's blockage of blood vessels in the brain. However, the possibility that erythropoietin may be neuroprotective is inconsistent with the poor transport of the chemical into the brain and the low levels of erythropoietin receptors expressed on neuronal cells.

Psychiatric diseases

Randomized clinical control trials have shown promising results of EPO in improving cognition which is often intractable with the current treatment of mood disorders and schizophrenia.These domains include speed of complex cognitive processing across attention,memory and executive function.

Preterm infants 
Infants born early often require transfusions with red blood cells and have low levels of erythropoietin. Erythropoietin has been studied as a treatment option to reduce anemia in preterm infants. Treating infants less than 8 days with erythropoietin old may slightly reduce the need for red blood cell transfusions, but increases the risk of retinopathy. Due to the limited clinical benefit and increased risk of retinopathy, early or late erythropoietin treatment is not recommended for preterm infants.

Adverse effects 

Epoetin alfa is generally well tolerated. Common side effects include high blood pressure, headache, disabling cluster migraine (resistant to remedies), joint pain, and clotting at the injection site. Rare cases of stinging at the injection site, skin rash, and flu-like symptoms (joint and muscle pain) have occurred within a few hours following administration. More serious side effects, including allergic reactions, seizures and thrombotic events (e.g., heart attacks, strokes, and pulmonary embolism) rarely occur. Chronic self-administration of the drug has been shown to cause increases in blood hemoglobin and hematocrit to abnormally high levels, resulting in dyspnea and abdominal pain.

Erythropoietin is associated with an increased risk of adverse cardiovascular complications in patients with kidney disease if it is used to target an increase of hemoglobin levels above 13.0 g/dl.

Early treatment (before an infant is 8 days old) with erythropoietin correlated with an increase in the risk of retinopathy of prematurity in premature and anemic infants, raising concern that the angiogenic actions of erythropoietin may exacerbate retinopathy. Since anemia itself increases the risk of retinopathy, the correlation with erythropoietin treatment may be incidental.

Safety advisories in anemic cancer patients 

Amgen sent a "dear doctor" letter in January 2007 that highlighted results from a recent anemia of cancer trial, and warned doctors to consider use in that off-label indication with caution.

Amgen advised the U.S. Food and Drug Administration (FDA) regarding the results of the DAHANCA 10 clinical trial. The DAHANCA 10 data monitoring committee found that three-year loco-regional cancer control in subjects treated with Aranesp was significantly worse than for those not receiving Aranesp (p=0.01).

In response to these advisories, the FDA released a Public Health Advisory
on 9 March 2007, and a clinical alert for doctors on 16 February 2007, about the use of erythropoiesis-stimulating agents (ESAs) such as epogen and darbepoetin. The advisory recommended caution in using these agents in cancer patients receiving chemotherapy or off chemotherapy, and indicated a lack of clinical evidence to support improvements in quality of life or transfusion requirements in these settings.

In addition, on 9 March 2007, drug manufacturers agreed to new black box warnings about the safety of these drugs.

On 22 March 2007, a congressional inquiry into the safety of erythropoietic growth factors was reported in the news media.  Manufacturers were asked to suspend drug rebate programs for physicians and to also suspend marketing the drugs to patients.

Several publications and FDA communications have increased the level of concern related to adverse effects of ESA therapy in selected groups. In a revised black box warning, the FDA notes significant risks, advising that ESAs should be used only in patients with cancer when treating anemia specifically caused by chemotherapy, and not for other causes of anemia. Further, the warning states that ESAs should be discontinued once the patient's chemotherapy course has been completed.

Interactions 

Drug interactions with erythropoietin include:
 Major: lenalidomide—risk of thrombosis
 Moderate: cyclosporine—risk of high blood pressure may be greater in combination with EPO. EPO may lead to variability in blood levels of cyclosporine.
 Minor: ACE inhibitors may interfere with hematopoiesis by decreasing the synthesis of endogenous erythropoietin or decreasing bone marrow production of red blood cells.

Society and culture

The publication of an editorial questioning the benefits of high-dose epoetin was canceled by the marketing branch of a journal after being accepted by the editorial branch highlighting concerns of conflict of interest in publishing.

In 2011, author Kathleen Sharp published a book, Blood Feud: The Man Who Blew the Whistle on One of the Deadliest Prescription Drugs Ever,
alleging drug maker Johnson & Johnson encouraged doctors to prescribe epoetin in high doses, particularly for cancer patients, because this would increase sales by hundreds of millions of dollars.  Former sales representatives Mark Duxbury and Dean McClennan, claimed that the bulk of their business selling epoetin to hospitals and clinics was Medicare fraud, totaling billion.

Biosimilars

In August 2007, Binocrit, Epoetin Alfa Hexal, and Abseamed were approved for use in the European Union.

References

External links 
 

Antianemic preparations
Growth factors
Erythropoiesis-stimulating agents
Amgen
Johnson & Johnson brands
Recombinant proteins